Faizan Khan (born 30 October 1986) is an Indian cricketer. He made his List A debut for Sikkim in the 2018–19 Vijay Hazare Trophy on 20 September 2018. He made his first-class debut for Sikkim in the 2018–19 Ranji Trophy on 1 November 2018.

References

External links
 

1986 births
Living people
Indian cricketers
Sikkim cricketers
Place of birth missing (living people)